is a Japanese video game developer. The company was founded in August 2004 as DP Inc. and merged with Paon Corporation, Ltd. in March 2015 to form Paon DP.

Paon Corporation was founded on January 20, 1999. Through a partnership with Nintendo, Paon developed DK: King of Swing, Donkey Kong Barrel Blast and DK: Jungle Climber. Paon was also involved in development of 2000 SNK's Neo Geo Pocket Color fighting game titles, SNK Gals' Fighters as composer and sound work team, as well as composer to some other Neo Geo Pocket Color titles. When the company Data East went bankrupt, Paon became composed of former Data East staff and bought the rights to some of their games, including Karnov, Chelnov, Windjammers, and the Kuuga trilogy, all of which are now owned by Paon DP, and the Glory of Heracles series, which is partially owned by them. The rights to the Glory of Heracles series are now split between Paon DP and Nintendo; Nintendo and Paon DP co-own the copyright for the series, while the trademark is solely owned by Nintendo. Paon developed Glory of Heracles in 2008, the fifth title of the Glory of Heracles series, which was published by Nintendo. In 2010, the company entered into the business of mobile game development.

Paon merged with DP Co., Ltd. on March 1, 2015 to form Paon DP. An associate company of pachislot maker Daito Giken, (since the company's chairman is the same as Daito Giken).

As a result of the merger, DP became the surviving entity while Paon Corporation was dissolved. The new company now develops mobile games only to Japan, as well as often licensing their owned properties, in 2017, Paon DP moved its headquarters to Kita, Tokyo.

Games developed, co-developed, licensed or published by Paon DP

 Puzzle Link 2 (1999, SNK, Neo Geo Pocket Color)
 Nightmare in the Dark (2000, Eleven, Gavaking (JP)/SNK (US), Arcade)
 SNK Gals' Fighters (2000, SNK, Neo Geo Pocket Color)
 Dino Crisis (2000, Virgin Interactive, Dreamcast, PlayStation)
 Big Bang Pro Wrestling (2001, SNK, Neo Geo Pocket Color)
 Lowrider (2002, Pacific Century Cyber Works (JP)/Jaleco (US), PlayStation 2)
 Tenchu: Wrath of Heaven (2003, FromSoftware (JP)/Activision (US), PlayStation 2)
 Fire ProWresting Z (2003, Spike, PlayStation 2)
 Dragon Ball Z: Budokai 2 (2003, Bandai (JP)/Atari (WW), PlayStation 2, Nintendo GameCube)
 The Wild Rings (2003, Microsoft Game Studios, Xbox)
 Blood Will Tell (2004, Sega, PlayStation 2)
 Tenchu: Return from Darkness (2004, FromSoftware (JP)/Activision (US), Xbox)
 Dragon Quest & Final Fantasy in Itadaki Street Special (2004, Square Enix, PlayStation 2)
 Daito Giken Kōshiki Pachi-Slot Simulator: Yoshimune (2004, Daito Giken, Inc., PlayStation 2)
 DK: King of Swing (2005, Nintendo, Game Boy Advance)
 Saint Seiya: The Sanctuary (2005, Bandai, PlayStation 2)
 Daito Giken Kōshiki Pachi-Slot Simulator: Ossu! Banchō (2005, Daito Giken, Inc., PlayStation 2, PlayStation Portable)
 Harukanaru Toki no Naka de 3 (2005, Koei, PlayStation 2)
 Haunting Ground (2005, Capcom, PlayStation 2)
 Trapt (2005, Tecmo, PlayStation 2)
 Saint Seiya: The Hades (2006, Namco Bandai Games, PlayStation 2)
 Daito Giken Kōshiki Pachi-Slot Simulator: Hihōden (2006, Daito Giken, Inc., PlayStation 2)
 Daito Giken Kōshiki Pachi-Slot Simulator: Hihōden - Ossu! Banchō - Yoshimune DS (2007, Nintendo DS)
 Donkey Kong Barrel Blast (2007, Nintendo, Wii)
 Chelnov: Atomic Runner (2007, Wii Virtual Console)
 Herakles no Eikō 3: Kamigami no Chinmoku (2007, Wii)
 DK: Jungle Climber (2007, Nintendo, Nintendo DS)
 Daito Giken Kōshiki Pachi-Slot Simulator: Shake II (2007, PlayStation 2)
 Super Smash Bros. Brawl (2008, Nintendo, Wii)
 Herakles no Eikō 4: Kamigami no Okurimono (2008, Wii)
 Glory of Heracles (2008, Nintendo, Nintendo DS)
 New Horizon English Course 1 (2008, Nintendo DS)
 Daito Giken Kōshiki Pachi-Slot Simulator: Shin Yoshimune (2008, PlayStation 2)
 New Horizon English Course 2 (2008, Nintendo DS)
 Herakles no Eikō III: Kamigami no Chinmoku (2008, J2ME, BREW, Doja)
 New Horizon English Course 3 (2008, Nintendo DS)
 Daito Giken Koushiki Pachislot Simulator: 24-Twenty-Four (2008, PlayStation 2)
 Klonoa (2008, Namco (JP)/Namco Bandai Games (US), Wii)
 Zettai Zetsumei Toshi 3: Kowareyuku Machi to Kanojo no Uta (2009, Irem, PlayStation Portable)
 Daito Giken Kōshiki Pachi-Slot Simulator: Ossu! Misao - Maguro Densetsu Portable (2010, PlayStation Portable)
 AquaSpace (2010, Nintendo,  WiiWare)
 Daito Giken Kōshiki Pachi-Slot Simulator: Ossu! Misao - Maguro Densetsu Portable (2010, PlayStation Portable)
 Daito Giken Kōshiki Pachi-Slot Simulator: Hana to Ikimono Rittai Zukan (2011, Nintendo 3DS)
 Herakles no Eikō: Ugokidashita Kamigami (2011, Nintendo 3DS)
 Daito Giken Kōshiki Pachi-Slot Simulator: Hihōden - Fūjirareta Megami Portable (2012, PlayStation Portable)
 Mario & Luigi: Dream Team (2013, Nintendo, Nintendo 3DS)
 Daito Giken Kōshiki Pachi-Slot Simulator: Hihōden - Taiyō o Motomeru Monotachi (2013, PlayStation 3)
 Natural Doctrine (2014, Kadokawa Games (JP)/NIS America (US), PlayStation 3, PlayStation Vita, PlayStation 4)
 Scratch Pirates (2014, iOS, Android)
 The Legend of Heroes: Trails in the Sky FC Evolution (2015, Kadokawa Games, PlayStation Vita)
 Bamon Kingdom Ω (2015, iOS, Android)
 Dribato! -Dream Card Battle- (2015, Android)
 Wonder Oracle (2016, iOS, Android)
 World of Summoners (2016, iOS, Android)
 Prone Position (2017, iOS)
 Alien Egg (2017, iOS, Android)
 Nyanko on the Island of Hoshino (2018 iOS, Android)
 Gotsuan Legend (2019, iOS)
 There is a Strain (2020, iOS)
 Herakles no Eikō III: Kamigami no Chinmoku (2020, Nintendo Switch)
 Daito Yoshisume City (2021, iOS, Android)
 Windjammers 2 (2022, Dotemu, PlayStation 4, Windows, Xbox One, Nintendo Switch, Stadia)

See also
Suzak
8ing
Nd Cube
Dimps
TOSE
Good-Feel

References

External links
 

Amusement companies of Japan
Video game companies established in 2004
Video game companies of Japan
Video game development companies
Japanese companies established in 2004